Battlefront II: Inferno Squad is a novel that is set in the Star Wars Universe and written by Christie Golden. The novel was published in 2017 by Del Rey Books. The story takes place immediately after the events of Star Wars: Episode IV - A New Hope (1977). Inferno Squad is the second book in the Star Wars: Battlefront Tie-In novel book series, following Battlefront: Twilight Company. The novel follows Iden Versio, protagonist of the Star Wars Battlefront II single-player campaign. The book focuses on Inferno Squad's creation and its early missions.

Plot summary
The book starts with Iden as a TIE Fighter pilot protecting the Death Star from the Rebel Alliance's starfighters at the Battle of Yavin. We then see her and other Imperials called to a secret meeting. Iden's father forms Inferno Squad, a special forces unit, and they are given a mission to recover blackmail material from an Imperial Governor. Then, they must extract a rebel that decides to side with the Galactic Empire, betraying the other rebels. After the team recovers a data chip from that mission, they go on an undercover mission to join the Dreamers, a rebel partisan group that is the sole remnant of Saw Gerrera's Rebels. Eventually, the rebel group is destroyed and Iden encounters the mysterious advisor of the group. He turns out to be Lux Bonteri, a character in the animated series The Clone Wars and former senator and friend of Saw Gererra.

Main characters

Iden Versio serves as the main protagonist of the story while Gideon Hask, Del Meeko and Seyn Marana serve as secondary protagonists and Staven as the antagonist. Garrick Versio has a supporting role.

Reception
Megan Crouse of Den of Geek gave the book a 3.5 out of 5 rating.
Youtini rated this book 7.8/10

Publishing
This book was published by Del Rey Books, a division of Penguin Random House. This book was initially released on July 25, 2017.

See also
List of Star Wars books

References

External links
Inferno Squad on Youtini, a Star Wars book information site
Inferno Squad on Wookieopedia, a Star Wars Wiki

2017 American novels
Novels based on Star Wars video games
Articles with short description
Novels by Christie Golden
Del Rey books